The Roque Sáenz Peña Hospital (in Spanish, Hospital Dr. Roque Sáenz Peña) is a public municipal hospital in Rosario, province of Santa Fe, Argentina. It serves as a secondary referral hospital for the South and Southwest Districts of the city.

The hospital is structured around three main areas:
 Children's health area: pediatrics, neonatology, pediatric ER
 Adults' area: several specialties, general ER
 Women's area: birthing center, gynaecology, tocogynaecologic ER

The hospital's labor ward serves an average of 1,800 annual births. This area has a programme for the promotion of breastfeeding, for which it received the award of Mother and Child-Friendly Hospital (Hospital Amigo de la Madre y el Niño) from UNICEF Argentina.

History
The creation of a sanitary and first aid facility in the south of Rosario was first decided in 1921. This healthcare center was opened on 20 August 1923 in its current location. It received the name of former president Roque Sáenz Peña in 1933. A labor ward located in a different building was transferred to the hospital in 1961.

References

Buildings and structures in Rosario, Santa Fe
Hospitals in Argentina
Hospitals established in 1923
Municipal hospitals
1923 establishments in Argentina